Kelavarapalli is a village in the Hosur taluk of Krishnagiri district, Tamil Nadu, India. There is a dam across the Ponnaiyar river in this village.

References 

 

Villages in Krishnagiri district